Godo Holo Airstrip  is an airstrip serving Pikienkondre of Miranda in Suriname.

Charter Flights

Accidents and incidents
 On May 15, 2010, a Blue Wing Airlines Antonov An-28, registered PZ-TSV crashed minutes after take-off from this Godo Holo Airstrip, in a wooded area of eastern Suriname, some 5 km (3.1 miles) North East of Poeketi. This was on an interior flight to Zorg en Hoop Airport, Paramaribo. All six passengers and two crew members on board lost their lives in this crash.

See also

 List of airports in Suriname
 Transport in Suriname

References

External links
OurAirports - Godo Holo
OpenStreetMap - Godo Holo
Godo Holo Airstrip
 picture of PZ-TSV in better times

Airports in Suriname